Little Wars (translit. Horoub Saghira) is a 1982 French-Lebanese war film directed by Maroun Bagdadi. It was screened in the Un Certain Regard section at the 1982 Cannes Film Festival. The film screened at New York Film Festival on 2 October 1982.

Cast
 Roger Hawa as Talal
 Youcef Hosni as L'oncle de Soraya
 Nabil Ismaïl as Nabil
 Reda Khoury as- La mère de Talal
 Soraya Khoury as Soraya
 Rifaat Tarabay as Selim

References

External links

1982 films
French war films
1980s French-language films
1980s Arabic-language films
Films directed by Maroun Bagdadi
Lebanese Civil War films
1980s war films
1982 multilingual films
French multilingual films
Lebanese multilingual films
1980s French films